ʽAsr, or Qaryat ʽAsr, also transliterated as ʽAsir, is a western suburb of Sanaa, Yemen, located in Main District of Amanat al-Asimah Governorate. It is located just north of the road to al-Hudaydah, at the western edge of the Sanaa plain. The name ʽAsr is also used for the small wadi by the town, as well as the mountain nearby.

History 
ʽAsr is mentioned in both the Ghayat al-amani of Yahya ibn al-Husayn and the Kitab al-Simt of Muhammad ibn Hatim al-Yami al-Hamdani, with the earliest reference to it taking place in the year 1198 (594 AH).

In recent decades, ʽAsr has grown from a village into a major suburb of Sanaa, driven in part by the presence of an existing souk, which has grown into a center of commercial activity. The growth is also fueled by some industries relocating to ʽAsr.

References 

Villages in Sanaa Governorate